Laura Moriarty (born December 24, 1970, Honolulu, Hawaii) is an American novelist.

Early life and education
Moriarty was born in Honolulu in 1970. She earned a degree in social work before earning an M.A. in Creative Writing at the University of Kansas. She was the recipient of the George Bennett Fellowship for Creative Writing at Phillips Exeter Academy in New Hampshire.

Career
According to Moriarty, her debut novel (The Center Of Everything) was deeply influenced by a reading of Carl Sagan's The Demon-Haunted World. Other writers who have had a deep influence on Moriarty include Margaret Atwood, Tobias Wolff, and Jane Hamilton. Her favorite short story writer is Lorrie Moore.

Kirkus controversy
In 2017, Kirkus Reviews removed its starred review of Moriarty's novel American Heart on account of the book's "white point of view" and "public concern" about the novel's alleged "white savior narrative", as described by editor-in-chief Claiborne Smith in interviews with Vulture and NPR. The reviewer, a Muslim woman with expertise in young adult fiction, rewrote her text, adding that the story is "told exclusively through the filter of a white protagonist about a Muslim character," while the magazine removed the star. Moriarty commented that "the takeaway [from this episode] for white writers is don't even try to write about people who are different from you."

Personal life
Moriarty lives with her daughter in Lawrence, Kansas.

Selected publications
The Center of Everything. Hyperion, 2004
The Rest of Her Life. Hyperion, 2007
While I'm Falling. Hyperion, 2009
The Chaperone. Penguin, 2012
American Heart. HarperCollins, 2017

References

External links
Meet the Writers: Laura Moriarty Moriarty homepage at Barnes & Noble includes interviews, book descriptions, and biographical material
The Website of Laura Moriarty
Book Review: The Center of Everything
On the Bookshelf: The Rest of Her Life a book review

1970 births
Living people
21st-century American novelists
American women novelists
University of Kansas alumni
Writers from Honolulu
21st-century American women writers
Novelists from Hawaii